Trio may refer to:

Music

Groups
 Trio (music), an ensemble of three performers, or a composition for such an ensemble
 Jazz trio, pianist, double bassist, drummer
 Minuet and trio, a form in classical music
 String trio, a group of three string instruments
 Power trio, guitar, bass, and drums
 Piano trio, a trio including a piano
 Organ trio, a trio including a Hammond organ
 Trio (band), a German group formed in 1980

Works
 Trio (1987 album) by Dolly Parton, Emmylou Harris, and Linda Ronstadt
 Trio (Marcin Wasilewski album)
 Trio (Trio album) by German group Trio
 The Trio (Hank Jones album)
 The Trio (Oscar Peterson album)
 The Trio (1973 album), by Oscar Peterson, Joe Pass and Niels-Henning Pedersen
 The Trio (Ted Curson album)
 Trios (Carla Bley album), 2013
 "Trio", a song by King Crimson on the album Starless and Bible Black
 Trios, Op. 1 (Stamitz), a set of six orchestral pieces
 Trio (Steve Berry album) by the Steve Berry Trio

Musical component
 Trio (musical form), the secondary section of a work in ternary form, e.g. a minuet, scherzo or march

Film and television
 Trio (TV network)
 Trio (film), a 1950 anthology
 Trio (1997 film), a South Korean film directed by Park Chan-wook
 Trio (TV series), a South Korean drama
 "Trio" (Buffy the Vampire Slayer), a group of three fictional villains
 "Trio" (Glee)
 "Trio" (Stargate Atlantis)

Food and drinks
 Trio (chocolate bar), in the UK
 Trio (Indian soft drink), a citric soda

Technology
 S3 Trio, a range of graphics chipsets 3D Graphics Accelerator
 Trio Corporation, a Japanese audio product manufacturer
 Magnetom Trio, an MRI produced by Siemens
 Softonic.com's TRIO Office Suite software

Places
 Trio, South Carolina
 Trio, Belize, a village in Toledo District, Belize
 Trio Beach, a gazetted beach in Pak Sha Wan Peninsula, Sai Kung District, Hong Kong

Other uses
 Trio (1801 ship)
 Trio (trimaran), a sailboat designed by Lock Crowther in 1962
 Trio (Conner), a 2013 sculpture by Elizabeth Conner in Portland, Oregon
 Trio (Sugarman), a 1972 sculpture by George Sugarman in Milwaukee, Wisconsin
 TRIO (gene)
 TRIO (program), a group of student services and outreach programs
 Trio language
 Trio people, a South American ethnic group
 Trio World School
 Trio, a book by Dorothy Baker
 Trio, a novel by William Boyd

See also
 3 (disambiguation)
 Tri (disambiguation)
 Triad (disambiguation)
 Triarchy (disambiguation)
 Trilogy (disambiguation)
 Trinity (disambiguation)
 Triple (disambiguation)
 Triptych (disambiguation)
 Triumvirate
 Troika (disambiguation)
 Tryo
 Tirio (disambiguation)